Yuryevka is a rural locality (a selo) and the administrative center of Yuryevskaya Territorial Administration, Gubkinsky District, Belgorod Oblast, Russia. The population was 393 as of 2010. There are 8 streets.

Geography 
Yuryevka is located 43 km southwest of Gubkin (the district's administrative centre) by road. Ivanovka is the nearest rural locality.

References 

Rural localities in Gubkinsky District